Sainte-Croix is a commune in the Aisne départment in Hauts-de-France in northern France.

Geography
The river Ailette has its source in the commune.

Population

See also
Communes of the Aisne department

References

Communes of Aisne
Aisne communes articles needing translation from French Wikipedia